Boethus (c. 2nd century BCE) was a Greek sculptor.

Boethus may also refer to:

 Boethus of Sidon (c. 75 BCE – c. 10 BCE), Peripatetic philosopher
 Boethus of Sidon (Stoic) (fl. 2nd century BCE), Stoic philosopher

See also
 Boethius (disambiguation)
 Boethusians, a Jewish sect